Christoffer Carlsson (born 15 January 1989) is a Swedish footballer who plays for Falkenbergs FF as a midfielder.

References

External links
 

1989 births
Living people
Association football midfielders
Landskrona BoIS players
Falkenbergs FF players
Hammarby Fotboll players
Swedish footballers
Allsvenskan players
Superettan players
People from Falkenberg
Sportspeople from Halland County